Gianluca Frabotta (born 24 June 1999) is an Italian professional footballer who plays as a left-back for  club Frosinone, on loan from Juventus.

Coming through the youth system, Frabotta began his career at Bologna, who loaned him to Renate in 2018 and Pordenone in 2019. He joined Juventus in 2019, playing for their second team Juventus U23, before being made part of the first team in 2020.

Frabotta had represented Italy at youth level since 2017.

Club career

Bologna 
Frabottta received a few call-ups to the bench in Bologna's in Serie A games for the 2016–17 and 2017–18 seasons; however, did not make any appearances for the side.

Loan to Renate 
On 21 June 2018, Frabotta was signed by Serie C side Renate on a season-long loan deal. On 29 July he made his debut for Renate as a substitute replacing Giacomo Caccin in the 63rd minute of a 2–0 home defeat against Rezzato in the first round of Coppa Italia. On 16 September he made his Serie C debut as a starter in a 2–0 away win over Sambenedettese, he was replaced by Lorenzo Saporetti in the 72nd minute. One week later he played his first entire match for Renate, a 2–1 away defeat against Pordenone. In January 2019, Frabotta was re-called to Bologna leaving Renate with 13 appearances and 2 assists.

Loan to Pordenone 
On 11 January 2019, Frabotta was loaned to Serie C club Pordenone on a 6-month loan deal. On 26 January he made his debut for the club as a substitute replacing Michele De Agostini in the 69th minute of a 2–1 home defeat against Rimini. On 24 May he played his first entire match for the club, a 1–1 away draw against Ternana. Frabotta ended his 6-month loan to Pordenone with 7 appearances, including only 2 as a starter.

Juventus 
On 6 August 2019, Frabotta joined to Serie C club Juventus U23. He made his professional senior debut for Juventus, as well as his Serie A debut, on 1 August 2020, in a 3–1 home defeat to Roma. On 20 September, in Juventus's opening match of the 2020–21 season, Frabotta played as a starter against Sampdoria; Juventus won 3–0 at home. On 4 November, he made his UEFA Champions League debut, coming on as a second–half substitute for Juan Cuadrado in a 4–1 away win over Ferencváros in the group stage. Frabotta scored his first goal for Juventus on 27 January 2021, scoring his team's second goal in a 4–0 Coppa Italia win over SPAL in the quarter-finals.

Loan to Verona 
On 30 July 2021, Frabotta moved to Hellas Verona on loan.

Loans to Lecce and Frosinone 
On 27 June 2022, Frabotta was loaned to Lecce. Frabotta remained on the bench for Lecce in the first four games of the 2022–23 Serie A season. On 1 September 2022, he moved on a new loan to Frosinone with the consent of Lecce and Juventus.

International career 
Frabotta represented Italy at under-18, under-19, and under-21 levels. On 8 February 2017 he made his U18 debut in a 1–1 away draw against France; he was replaced by Luca Ranieri after 83 minutes. On 9 August 2017, Frabotta made his U19 debut as a substitute replacing Alessandro Tripaldelli in the 67th minute of a 2–0 away win over Croatia.

On 13 October 2020, he made his debut with Italy U21 playing as a starter in a 2021 UEFA European Championship qualification match against the Republic of Ireland, which ended in a 2–0 win.

Career statistics

Club

Honours 
Pordenone
 Serie C Group B: 2018–19
 Supercoppa di Serie C: 2019

Juventus U23
 Coppa Italia Serie C: 2019–20

Juventus
 Serie A: 2019–20
 Coppa Italia: 2020–21
 Supercoppa Italiana: 2020

References

External links 
 

1999 births
Footballers from Rome
Living people
Italian footballers
Italy under-21 international footballers
Italy youth international footballers
Association football fullbacks
Bologna F.C. 1909 players
A.C. Renate players
Pordenone Calcio players
Juventus Next Gen players
Juventus F.C. players
U.S. Lecce players
Hellas Verona F.C. players
Frosinone Calcio players
Serie A players
Serie B players
Serie C players